I Believe in Music is the second album released by singer-songwriter and actor Mac Davis. It was released in 1971, although the title song had already charted in 1970. The title track went on to become a standard and was covered by many artists in the 1970s, including a top 30 pop hit by Gallery in 1972.

Music reviewer Stephen Thomas Erlewine considered many of the songs to be more suitable for the album than on radio, and said:
  

The title song became Davis's signature song. His hit "Baby Don't Get Hooked On Me" was released after this album debuted, later in 1972.

Track listing

Personnel
Mac Davis - guitar, vocals
Al Kooper - electric guitar
Sal DiTroia - acoustic guitar
Dave Appell, Mitch Margo - rhythm guitar
Eric Weissberg - steel guitar
Kirk Hamilton - bass guitar
Mitch Margo, Ron Frangipane - keyboards
Hank Medress, Mitch Margo, Phil Margo - drums, percussion
New York Horns and Strings - orchestra
Jay Siegel Singers, Cissy Houston Singers - chorus
Ron Frangipane - "sweetening" arrangements
Technical
Pete Weiss - engineer, mixing
Guy Webster - photography

Charts 
Album

Singles

References

Mac Davis albums
1971 albums
Columbia Records albums